Asif Jan (born 11 February 1979) is a Trinidadian cricketer. He played in fifteen first-class matches for Trinidad and Tobago from 1999 to 2003.

See also
 List of Trinidadian representative cricketers

References

External links
 

1979 births
Living people
Trinidad and Tobago cricketers